The men's marathon event at the 2003 Pan American Games took place on Saturday, 9 August 2003. Brazil's title defender Vanderlei de Lima once again proved to be the best marathoner, clocking a winning time of 2h 19m 08s.

Medalists

Records

Results

See also
Athletics at the 2003 Pan American Games – Women's marathon
2003 World Championships in Athletics – Men's Marathon
Athletics at the 2004 Summer Olympics – Men's marathon

References
Results

Marathon, Men's
2003
Panamerican
2003 Panamerican Games